Maria by Callas (French: Maria par Callas) is a 2017 French documentary film about the life and career of opera singer Maria Callas.

Synopsis
 
The film depicts the life and work of opera singer Maria Callas in her own words by using her interviews, letters, and performances to tell her story. Told through performances, TV interviews, home movies, family photographs, private letters and unpublished memoirs—nearly all of which have never been shown to the public—the film reveals the essence of an extraordinary woman who rose from humble beginnings in New York City to become a glamorous international superstar and one of the greatest artists of all time.  Her letters and unpublished memoirs are read by opera singer Joyce DiDonato.

Release
Maria by Callas premiered at the  Rome Film Festival and at the La Baule Film & Score Festival in November 2017.  The film had a release in France on December 13, 2017.  The film had a limited release in the United States on November 2, 2018. It was shown on BBC Four on Christmas Day 2020.

Critical reception
The film has earned high critical praise. Maria by Callas currently has a score of 92% on review aggregator website Rotten Tomatoes from 73 reviews, with an average rating of 7.1/10. The website's critics consensus reads, "Maria by Callas offers an intimate look at the life of a brilliantly talented artist whose absorbing story matches the operatic heights reached by her work.

References

External links 

 
 
 
 

2017 films
2017 documentary films
French documentary films
Documentary films about singers
Documentary films about classical music and musicians
2010s Italian-language films
2010s French-language films
Sony Pictures Classics films
Documentary films about women in music
2010s English-language films
2017 multilingual films
French multilingual films
2010s French films